Michelle Rossignol,  (4 February 1940 – 18 May 2020) was a Canadian film actress. She appeared in fifteen films between 1956 and 2010. She was made an Officer of the Order of Canada in 1991 and a Knight of the National Order of Quebec in 2001.

Filmography
 Dust from Underground (Poussière sur la ville) - 1968
 Françoise Durocher, Waitress - 1972
 Once Upon a Time in the East (Il était une fois dans l'est) - 1974
 Let's Talk About Love (Parlez-nous d'amour) - 1976
 Cordélia - 1980
 Suzanne - 1980
 Beyond Forty (La Quarantaine) - 1982
 You (Toi) - 2007
 Twice a Woman (Deux fois une femme) - 2010

References

External links
 

1940 births
2020 deaths
20th-century Canadian actresses
21st-century Canadian actresses
Canadian film actresses
Canadian television actresses
Knights of the National Order of Quebec
Place of death missing
Officers of the Order of Canada
Actresses from Montreal
French Quebecers